Interstate Gospel is the third studio album by American country supergroup Pistol Annies, and their second with RCA Nashville. It was released on November 2, 2018. It is their first album since 2013's Annie Up. It was nominated for Best Country Album at the 62nd Grammy Awards. It is their very first Grammy nomination. In 2019, Rolling Stone named Interstate Gospel as one of their top ten albums of the decade, ranking it at 9.

Background
Announced on September 27, 2018, the Pistol Annies released three tracks, "Interstate Gospel", "Got My Name Changed Back" and "Best Years of My Life", as well as revealing the album title and cover art in a press release. "Stop, Drop and Roll One" was released as the fourth track on October 12. On October 17, the Annies debuted a fifth track, "Sugar Daddy", releasing it immediately following a performance on the CMT Artists of the Year telecast. "Masterpiece" was released on October 26.

Critical reception

The album received widespread critical acclaim. At Metacritic, which assigns a normalized rating out of 100 to reviews from mainstream publications, the album received an average score of 85, based on 9 reviews.

Commercial performance
Interstate Gospel debuted at number fifteen on the US Billboard 200 and at number one on the Top Country Albums chart with first week sales of 26,500 copies in pure album sales (30,000 in equivalent album units).  The album is also Pistol Annies' first number one on the Americana/Folk Albums chart.

As of March 2020, the album has sold 80,700 copies in the United States.

In the United Kingdom, Interstate Gospel debuted at number one on the UK Country Albums chart.

Track listing
All tracks written by Miranda Lambert, Ashley Monroe and Angaleena Presley, except "This Too Shall Pass", which was written by Monroe and Presley.

Personnel
Adapted from the album liner notes.

 Miranda Lambert – lead vocals, background vocals
 Ashley Monroe – lead vocals, background vocals
 Angaleena Presley – lead vocals, background vocals, acoustic guitar
 Frank Liddell – producer 
 Glenn Worf – producer, bass 
 Eric Masse – producer, mixing 
 Frank Carter Rische – acoustic guitar, electric guitar
 Fats Kaplin – acoustic guitar, fiddle, steel guitar
 Chris Coleman – brass
 Dan Dugmore – electric guitar, dobro, additional piano, steel guitar, wurlitzer
 Matt Chamberlain – drums, percussion
 Chuck Leavell – piano
 Dan Davis – assistant
 Anna Lise Liddell – assistant
 Miller Mobley – photography
 Brittany Hamlin – production coordination
 Stephen Marcussen – mastering 
 Stewart Whitmore – mastering assistant
 Johnny Lavoy – hair, makeup, styling
 Moani Lee – hair, makeup, styling
 Leah Hoffman – hair, makeup, styling
 Lindsay Doyle – hair, makeup, styling
 Tiffany Gifford – hair, makeup, styling
 Tracy Baskette Fleaner – creative direction
 Stephanie Eatherly – art direction

Charts

Weekly charts

Year-end charts

References

2018 albums
RCA Records albums
Pistol Annies albums
Albums produced by Frank Liddell
Albums produced by Chuck Ainlay